John Pearse (?1760–1836), of 50 Lincoln's Inn Fields, Middlesex and Chilton Lodge, near Hungerford, Berkshire, was an English politician.

He was a Member (MP) of the Parliament of the United Kingdom for Devizes 1818 to 1832.

Pearse also served as a director of the Bank of England (1790–1791, 1793–1808 and 1812–1828), as its  deputy governor (1808–1810) and finally as its governor (1810–1812).

References

1760 births
1836 deaths
People from Hungerford
People from the London Borough of Camden
Members of the Parliament of the United Kingdom for English constituencies
UK MPs 1818–1820
UK MPs 1820–1826
UK MPs 1826–1830
UK MPs 1830–1831
UK MPs 1831–1832
Deputy Governors of the Bank of England
Governors of the Bank of England